Isaac Salmonsen (1846 – 1910) was a Danish bookseller and publisher.

He established the publishing house Brødrene Salmonsen in 1871, along with his brother. He is particularly known for publishing the Danish encyclopedia, Salmonsens Store Illustrerede Konversationsleksikon. The first edition of the encyclopedia came in nineteen volumes between 1893 and 1911. The second edition of the encyclopedia came in twenty-six volumes between 1915 and 1930.

References

1846 births
1910 deaths
19th-century Danish publishers (people)
20th-century Danish publishers (people)
Danish Jews